The tenth and final season of Friends, an American sitcom created by David Crane and Marta Kauffman, premiered on NBC on September 25, 2003. Friends was produced by Bright/Kauffman/Crane Productions, in association with Warner Bros. Television. The season contains 17 episodes (with 5 double-length episodes, including the premiere and finale) and concluded airing on May 6, 2004.

Season synopsis
The season premiere opens in Barbados, where the season 9 finale ended: Joey sees Ross, his best friend, and Charlie, his ex-girlfriend, kissing in the hotel lobby, then goes to Rachel's room, where the two of them also kiss. However, before going further, they decide to seek Ross' approval, but Ross finds them kissing, back in Manhattan, before they can approach him. Ross tries to hide his hurt, to no avail. Joey eventually talks to Ross about the situation and Ross seems to give his blessings. After several obstacles prevent Joey and Rachel from consummating their relationship (including Joey unable to untie Rachel's bra and Rachel accidentally kneeing Joey in the crotch), they decide to remain platonic. By the sixth episode, Ross is single again when Charlie reunites with her ex-boyfriend.

Mike proposes to Phoebe and they marry mid-season. Monica and Chandler decide to adopt a child, after discovering they are infertile. They are eventually paired with a young, expecting mother named Erica (Anna Faris) and buy a house in Westchester county. Rachel is scouted for a fashion buyer job with Gucci, but her current boss (Mr. Zelner) is seated at the next table, in the restaurant where she is being interviewed. She is fired by Ralph Lauren and rejected by Gucci, which leaves her unemployed. While cleaning out her office at Ralph Lauren, she runs into Mark, her former  Bloomingdale's colleague (from Season 3), who offers her a job with Louis Vuitton in Paris. Ross, unaware and still in love with her, secures her job at Ralph Lauren, even convincing her former boss to increase her salary. However, Rachel chooses Louis Vuitton and Paris. Saying her goodbyes to everyone, Rachel goes to Ross' apartment last, where they spend the night together. Expecting Rachel to now cancel her plans for Paris, he is devastated when she does not.

In the season's (and series') final episode, Joey and Phoebe help pack up Monica and Chandler's belongings, while Erica delivers; to their surprise, she has twins, a boy (Jack) and a girl (Erica). Rachel leaves Ross' apartment. Gunther declares his love for Rachel (at Central Perk). Rachel has to leave for the airport, immediately after meeting the twins. 

While Joey, Monica and Chandler finish packing, Phoebe and Ross leave in her cab to catch Rachel at the airport, but they end up at JFK, the wrong airport. Meanwhile, Joey, Chandler and Monica disassemble the foosball table to remove a baby chick and duckling.

Phoebe's cell phone call to Rachel results in a chaotically absurd "phalange" panic and delay in the departure. They catch Rachel at the gate before she boards, but despite Ross' pleas, Rachel still boards. Ross returns home only to find an answering-machine message from Rachel declaring her love, but she is prevented by a flight attendant from leaving the plane, and her call is disconnected partway through. Ross is frantic until Rachel enters his apartment, saying "I got off the plane". They kiss and declare their love for each other. The last scene of the series is everyone putting their keys on the counter in Monica's apartment. When Rachel asks if they have time for one last coffee, Chandler jokingly replies, "Where?" Jefferson Airplane's Embryonic Journey plays as the camera pans across the empty apartment, before landing on the purple front door. The show then fades to black. The tag scene pans around New York.

Reception
Collider ranked it #6 on their ranking of the ten Friends seasons, and picked "The Last One" as its highlight. The final episode was watched by over 52.46 million people and is the 4th most watched episode in TV history.

Cast and characters

Main cast
 Jennifer Aniston as Rachel Green
 Courteney Cox-Arquette as Monica Geller
 Lisa Kudrow as Phoebe Buffay-Hannigan
 Matt LeBlanc as Joey Tribbiani
 Matthew Perry as Chandler Bing
 David Schwimmer as Ross Geller

Recurring cast
 Paul Rudd as Mike Hannigan
 Aisha Tyler as Charlie Wheeler
 Anna Faris as Erica 
 James Michael Tyler as Gunther

Guest stars
 Anne Dudek as Precious
 Maggie Wheeler as Janice Litman-Goralnik
 Elliott Gould as Jack Geller
 Christina Pickles as Judy Geller
 Giovanni Ribisi as Frank Buffay, Jr.
 Christina Applegate as Amy Green
 Greg Kinnear as Benjamin Hobart
 Ron Leibman as Leonard Green
 Ellen Pompeo as Missy Goldberg
 Donny Osmond as himself 
 Danny DeVito as the stripper
 Dakota Fanning as Mackenzie
 Jane Lynch as Ellen
 Jennifer Coolidge as Amanda Buffamonteezi
 Maria Pitillo as Laura

Episodes

 denotes a "super-sized" 40-minute episode (with advertisements; actual runtime around 28 minutes).

Specials

Notes

References

External links
 

10
2003 American television seasons
2004 American television seasons